The E. N. Jenckes Store is an historic store on Main Street in Douglas, Massachusetts. The Greek Revival two-story wood-frame structure was built in 1833; it features a side-gable configuration in which the roof overhangs a two-story porch. The store was built by Elias Balcome, but was operated by members of the Jenckes family for most of the 20th century. The building is now a museum operated by the Douglas Historical Society.

The building was listed on the National Register of Historic Places in 1988.

See also
National Register of Historic Places listings in Worcester County, Massachusetts

References

External links

 Douglas Historical Society

Commercial buildings on the National Register of Historic Places in Massachusetts
Buildings and structures in Douglas, Massachusetts
Retail buildings in Massachusetts
Museums in Worcester County, Massachusetts
History museums in Massachusetts
National Register of Historic Places in Worcester County, Massachusetts

Commercial buildings completed in 1833